In enzymology, a tRNA (5-methylaminomethyl-2-thiouridylate)-methyltransferase is an enzyme that catalyzes the chemical reaction

S-adenosyl-L-methionine + tRNA  S-adenosyl-L-homocysteine + tRNA containing 5-methylaminomethyl-2-thiouridylate

Thus, the two substrates of this enzyme are S-adenosyl methionine and tRNA, whereas its two products are S-adenosylhomocysteine and tRNA containing 5-methylaminomethyl-2-thiouridylic acid.

This enzyme belongs to the family of transferases, specifically those transferring one-carbon group methyltransferases.  The systematic name of this enzyme class is S-adenosyl-L-methionine:tRNA (5-methylaminomethyl-2-thio-uridylate)-methyltransferase. Other names in common use include transfer ribonucleate 5-methylaminomethyl-2-thiouridylate, 5-methyltransferase, and tRNA 5-methylaminomethyl-2-thiouridylate 5'-methyltransferase.

Structural studies

References

 
 

EC 2.1.1
Enzymes of known structure